is a Japanese anime series that combined episodes of three series,  and . Heli-Tako Pu-Chan was broadcast in 42 episodes, while Fushigi Mahou Fan Fan Pharmacy was broadcast in 48 episodes, both between February 14, 1998, and February 6, 1999.

The series had different protagonists and own plotlines, being completely unrelated to each other. The characters who introduced the segments were Nyarome and Kemunpas, characters from Mōretsu Atarō created by Fujio Akatsuka.

External links
Official Toei Animation Anime Syuukan DX! Mi-Pha-Pu site 

1998 anime television series debuts
Comedy anime and manga
Magical girl anime and manga
Shōjo manga
Toei Animation television